Jazz Is a Kick is an album by jazz trombonist and arranger Bob Brookmeyer recorded in 1960 for the Mercury label.

Reception

The Allmusic review by Scott Yanow stated: "This interesting LP matches together valve trombonist Bob Brookmeyer with the slide trombone of Curtis Fuller. ...Brookmeyer and Fuller display contrasting styles while blending together quite well on the ensemble".

Track listing
All compositions by Bob Brookmeyer except as indicated
 "Air Conditioned" - 4:53
 "Exactly Like You" (Jimmy McHugh, Dorothy Fields) - 4:33
 "This Can't Be Love" (Richard Rodgers, Lorenz Hart) - 3:21
 "Green Stamps" - 4:33
 "The Things I Love" (Harold Barlow, Lew Harris) - 4:39
 "Only When You're Near" (Chuck Darwin, P. Girard) - 3:30
 "You're My Everything" (Harry Warren, Joe Young, Mort Dixon) - 3:17
 "Cooperation" (Ford Knox) - 7:30

Personnel 
 Bob Brookmeyer - valve trombone
 Curtis Fuller - trombone
 Thad Jones, Joe Newman - trumpet (tracks 1-3 & 5)
 Hank Jones (tracks 1-3 & 5), Wynton Kelly (tracks 4 & 6-8) - piano
 Paul Chambers (tracks 4 & 6-8), Eddie Jones (tracks 1-3 & 5) - bass
 Paul Motian  (tracks 4 & 6-8), Charlie Persip  (tracks 1-3 & 5) - drums

References 

1960 albums
Mercury Records albums
Bob Brookmeyer albums